Tatchell is a surname. Notable people with the surname include:

 Peter Tatchell (born 1952), gay rights activist in the UK
 Spence Tatchell (1924–2007), Canadian ice hockey player
 Terri Tatchell (born 1978), Canadian screenwriter
 Thomas Tatchell (1867–1936), Australian cricketer

See also
 Hatchell